Melanie Schwarz (born 18 July 1989) is an Italian luger who has competed since 1996. A natural track luger, she won a bronze medal in the women's singles event at the 2011 FIL World Luge Natural Track Championships in Umhausen, Austria.

References
 FIL-Luge profile

External links

 

1989 births
Living people
Italian female lugers
People from Latsch
People from Schlanders
Germanophone Italian people
Sportspeople from Südtirol